Jan Schulmeister (born 11 March 1986) is a Czech football forward who plays for Sigma Olomouc.

Honours 
SK Sigma Olomouc
 Czech Cup: 2011–12
 Czech Supercup: 2012

References

External links
 
 

Czech footballers
Czech Republic youth international footballers
Czech Republic under-21 international footballers
Czech First League players
SK Sigma Olomouc players
1986 births
Living people
Association football forwards
FC Hradec Králové players
Fotbal Fulnek players
FK Čáslav players